Herbert Edward Perry Jr. (born September 15, 1969) is an American former college and professional baseball player who was an infielder in Major League Baseball (MLB) for all or parts of nine season during the 1990s and 2000s.  Perry played college baseball for the University of Florida, and thereafter, he played professionally for the Cleveland Indians, Tampa Bay Devil Rays, Chicago White Sox and Texas Rangers of MLB.

Early years 

Perry was born in Live Oak, Florida in 1969. He attended Lafayette High School in Mayo, Florida, and played high school football and baseball for the Lafayette Hornets

College career 

Perry accepted an athletic scholarship to attend the University of Florida in Gainesville, Florida, where he played for coach Joe Arnold's Florida Gators baseball team from 1988 to 1991, and was also a quarterback for coach Galen Hall's Gators football team in 1987 and 1988.  Perry was a key member of the Gators' first-ever College World Series teams in 1988 and 1991.  He led the team with a .370 batting average in 1989.  He graduated from the University of Florida with a bachelor's degree in agricultural operations management in 1991.

Professional career 

Perry was affectionately known as Herbert "The Milkman" Perry by Chicago White Sox announcer Ken Harrelson. Injuries shortened his major league career to only nine seasons. He retired from baseball with a career batting average of .272.

Life after the Major Leagues 

Perry currently resides in the town of Mayo, Florida and manages a pre cast septic tank business, He has two sons, 2 daughters- one of which is adopted: Ethan, Drew, Gabrielle and Olivia.  Perry and his wife, Sheila, adopted daughter Olivia from Ukraine in 2009.

He is the older brother of MLB utility player Chan Perry.

See also 

 Florida Gators
 Florida Gators football, 1980–89
 List of Florida Gators baseball players
 List of University of Florida alumni

References

External links

1969 births
Living people
American football quarterbacks
Baseball players from Florida
Canton-Akron Indians players
Chicago White Sox players
Cleveland Indians players
Florida Gators baseball players
Florida Gators football players
Kinston Indians players
Major League Baseball third basemen
People from Live Oak, Florida
Tampa Bay Devil Rays players
Texas Rangers players
People from Mayo, Florida
Buffalo Bisons (minor league) players
Charlotte Knights players
Durham Bulls players
Frisco RoughRiders players
Gulf Coast Devil Rays players
St. Petersburg Devil Rays players
Watertown Indians players